Christina Sofia Nerbrand (born September 16, 1973 in Stockholm) is a Swedish journalist. She is CEO and editor in chief for Neo, a classical liberal magazine that she founded in 2006. Sofia Nerbrand also has a column at the op-ed page in Svenska Dagbladet. Sofia Nerbrand was married to Johan Norberg, with whom she has two children. She lives in Malmo, Sweden.

References 

1973 births
Living people
Writers from Stockholm
Swedish political writers
Swedish women non-fiction writers